In mathematics, the Smith conjecture  states that if f is a diffeomorphism  of the 3-sphere of finite order, then the fixed point set of f cannot be a nontrivial knot.

 showed that a non-trivial orientation-preserving diffeomorphism of finite order with fixed points must have a fixed point set equal to a circle, and asked in  if the fixed point set could be knotted.   proved the Smith conjecture for the special case of diffeomorphisms of order 2 (and hence any even order).

 gave an example of a continuous involution of the 3-sphere whose fixed point set is a wildly embedded circle, so the Smith conjecture is false in the topological (rather than the smooth or PL) category.  showed that the analogue of the Smith conjecture in higher dimensions is false: the fixed point set of a periodic diffeomorphism of a sphere of dimension at least 4 can be a knotted sphere of codimension 2.

See also
 Hilbert–Smith conjecture

References

3-manifolds
Conjectures
Diffeomorphisms
Theorems in topology